This article lists goals which have been considered among the fastest ever scored in association football matches. The records concerning the fastest goals are disputed for a number of reasons. Ray Spiller of the Association of Football Statisticians has argued that as there is no official system for recognizing the timing of goals there are always going to be disputes concerning these records.

In addition, many of the goals listed in the Guinness World Records as being among the fastest were not filmed, preventing the precise timing of goals from being assessed. The status of Nawaf Al-Abed's goal which is credited as being scored after two seconds is also disputed given that the match was later declared void due to ineligible players, when several players over the age of 23 were found to have played in the age restricted game.

Marc Burrows' goal has also been considered the fastest ever but it was scored in an amateur reserve game. As there is no standard size for a football pitch some of the goals listed benefit from being played on smaller pitches that require the ball to travel a shorter distance before reaching the goal. Furthermore, many of the records listed come from English language publications and reflect a bias towards English football within the sources.

Under The Laws of the Game, specifically Law 8, goals may be scored directly from the kick-off. Some of the fastest goals on the list below are shots taken directly from kick-off.

Goals

The following is a list of goals scored by any kind of players, including juniors, amateurs, semi-professionals, professionals or women, in any football league, cup or other competition around the world.

See also
List of world association football records

References

Scoring (association football)
Association football records and statistics
Association football-related lists